Robin Trower Live is a live album by Robin Trower. Recorded at the Stockholm Concert Hall in Sweden on 3 February 1975 for the Swedish Broadcasting Corporation, it was released on vinyl in 1976, and re-released on CD in 1990, 2000, and 2004.
The album peaked at #10 the US Billboard 200. In an interview with Guitar Player in May 2006, Trower explained that the band was not aware the show was being taped, thinking they were playing for a radio broadcast only. Hence, he says, "We were loose and uninhibited, and we played one of our best shows."

Track listing
All tracks composed by Robin Trower; except where indicated

Side one
"Too Rolling Stoned" – 6:25
"Daydream" (James Dewar, Robin Trower) – 7:50
"Rock Me Baby" (B.B. King, Joe Josea) – 5:48

Side two
"Lady Love" (Dewar, Trower) – 3:01
"I Can't Wait Much Longer" (Frankie Miller, Trower) – 6:46
"Alethea" – 4:00
"Little Bit of Sympathy" – 5:38

Personnel
Robin Trower – guitar
James Dewar – bass, vocals
Bill Lordan – drums
Trevor Kay - cover
Brian Cooke, Jim Marshall - photography
Geoff Emerick and Robin Trower - remix at Air Studios

Charts

References

1976 live albums
Robin Trower albums
Chrysalis Records live albums